The Bahamas is represented at the 2006 Commonwealth Games in Melbourne by a xx-member strong contingent comprising 25 sportspersons and xx officials.

Competitors
The following is the list of number of competitors participating in the Games.

Medallists

The following Bahamian competitors won medals at the Games. In the 'by discipline' sections below, medallists' names are in bold.

Athletics

Men
Track

* Competed in relay heat only

Field

Triple jumper Leevan Sands was initially named in the Bahamian team but later suspended for testing positive to methamphetamine, a hard stimulant.

Women
Track

Field

Key
Note–Ranks given for track events are within the athlete's heat only
Q = Qualified for the next round
q = Qualified for the next round as a fastest loser or, in field events, by position without achieving the qualifying target
NR = National record
WB= World Best
N/A = Round not applicable for the event
Bye = Athlete not required to compete in round

Boxing

Cycling

Road

Men

Swimming

Men

Women

 Lize-Mari Retief who qualified in 14th place subsequently withdrew from the semi finals. This allowed Dillette to contest the semi as she was the first alternate.

References

Nations at the 2006 Commonwealth Games
2006
Commonwealth Games